Madeleine Slade (22 November 1892 – 20 July 1982), also known as Mirabehn or Meera Behn, was a British supporter of the Indian Independence Movement who in the 1920s left her home in England to live and work with Mahatma Gandhi. She devoted her life to human development and the advancement of Gandhi's principles.

She was the daughter of the British Rear-Admiral Sir Edmond Slade and Florence Madeleine, eldest daughter of Mr James Carr Saunders of Milton Heath, Dorking (but born in Reigate, Surrey in 1870). Sir Edmund and his wife also had another daughter, Madeline's sister Rhona.

Early life 
Mirabehn was born into a well connected British family in 1892. Her father, Sir Edmond Slade was an officer in the Royal Navy who was posted in Mirabehn's early years as the Commander-in-Chief of the East Indies Squadron, later becoming director of the Naval Intelligence Division. She spent much of her childhood with her maternal grandfather who owned a large country estate and was from an early age a nature and animal lover.

The great passion of the young Mirabehn was the music of Ludwig van Beethoven. She took to the piano and concerts and even went on to become a concert manager. In 1921 she even arranged for a German conductor to lead the London Orchestra in concerts featuring Beethoven and helped bring about an end to the British boycott of German musicians that followed the First World War.

She also visited Vienna and Germany to see the places where Beethoven had lived and composed his music and she read extensively on him. She read Romain Rolland's books on Beethoven and later sought and met with him at Villeneuve, where he was then living. During this meeting, Rolland mentioned about a new book of his called Mahatma Gandhi which she had not read then. Rolland described Gandhi as another Christ and as the greatest figure of the 20th century. On her return to England she read Rolland's biography of Gandhi and the book convinced her to become a disciple of the Mahatma.
She wrote to Gandhi asking him if she could become his disciple and live with him in Sabarmati Ashram. Gandhi replied, inviting her over but also warning her of the discipline of the Ashram's inmates. Having made her decision, she went about training herself for all the demands of an ascetic's life in India including vegetarianism, spinning and teetotalism. That year in England, she subscribed to Young India and spent a part of her time in Paris reading the Bhagvad Gita and some of the Rigveda in French.

Life in India and role in the independence movement 
She arrived in Ahmedabad on 7 November 1925 where she was received by Mahadev Desai, Vallabhbhai Patel and Swami Anand. This was the beginning of her stay in India that lasted almost thirty-four years.  During her stay in India, Mirabehn went to the Gurukul Kahhngri to learn Hindi. Thereafter, Gandhi sent her to Bhagwat Bhakti Ashram of Rewari. She was given the nickname Mirabehn, a name that represented a Hindu mystic Mira, by Gandhi. 

Mirabehn's stay in India coincided with the zenith Gandhian phase of the freedom struggle. She accompanied Gandhi and others to the Round Table Conference in London in 1931. While on their way back from London, Mirabehn and Gandhi visited Rolland for a week and as they took his leave, Rolland gave her a book on Beethoven which he had written while she was in India. In 1960 as she began to read it, it convinced her to move to Austria and spend her remaining days in the land of Beethoven's music. The resumption of the Non-Cooperation Movement in 1931 saw her being imprisoned during 1932–33.

To plead India's case she also went abroad meeting, among others, David Lloyd George, General Smuts and Winston Churchill, and visited the United States, where she met Mrs. Roosevelt at the White House. Mirabehn also took an active interest in the establishment of the Sevagram Ashram and worked among the people of Orissa to resist any potential Japanese invasion non-violently in the beginning of 1942. She was arrested and detained with Gandhi in the Aga Khan Palace, Pune, from August 1942 to May 1944 where she saw Mahadev Desai and Kasturba Gandhi pass away. She was also a witness to the Simla Conference and the Cabinet Mission, the Interim Government and the Constituent Assembly, the Partition of India and the assassination of Mahatma Gandhi.

Post-independence life in India 
After her release from the Aga Khan Palace, with Gandhi's permission, she established the Kisan Ashram at a Village named Mooldaspur majra a site near Roorkee. The land was donated to her by the local villagers. After Independence, she established the Pashulok Ashram near Rishikesh and a settlement named Bapu Gram and the Gopal Ashram in Bhilangana in 1952. She took to dairying and farming experiments in these ashrams and also spent a while in Kashmir. During the time she spent in Kumaon and Garhwal she observed the destruction of the forests there and the impact it was having on floods in the plains. She wrote about it in an essay titled Something Wrong in the Himalaya but her advice was ignored by the Forest Department. In the 1980s, these areas witnessed a large Gandhian environmental campaign to save the forests called the Chipko Movement.

She returned to England in 1959. In 1960, she relocated to Austria and spent twenty-two years in small villages in the Vienna Woods (Baden, Hinterbrühl, Kracking), where she died in 1982.

She was awarded India's second highest civilian honour, the Padma Vibhushan, in 1981.

Books by Mirabehn 

Mirabehn's autobiography is titled The Spiritual Pilgrimage. She also published Bapu's Letters to Mira and New and Old Gleanings. At the time of her death she had also left behind an unpublished biography of Beethoven, the Spirit of Beethoven.

In popular culture 
 Actress Geraldine James portrayed her in Richard Attenborough's film, Gandhi, which premiered several months after Madeleine Slade's death in 1982.
 Sudhir Kakar's Mira and the Mahatma is a fictional account of the relationship between Gandhi and Slade as his disciple, Mirabehn.
 In his book, Rebels Against the Raj, Ramchandra Guha tells the story of how Slade and six other foreigners served India in its quest for independence from the British Raj.

Bibliography
 Spirits Pilgrimage, by Mirabehn. Great River Books. 1984. .
 New and old gleanings, by Mirabehn. Navajivan Pub. House. 1964.

See also
Gandhism
Sarla Behn

References

Further reading
 Letters to Mirabehn, by Mahatma Gandhi. # Greenleaf Books. 1983. .

External links

Biography from mkgandhi.org
In the company of Bapu: In the just-released Mira & the Mahatma, psychoanalyst Sudhir Kakar delves into the complex relationship between a remarkable Englishwoman and the man she worshiped – The Telegraph
Video interview with Mirabehn. A description of the video is here.

Indian independence activists
1892 births
1982 deaths
Recipients of the Padma Vibhushan in social work
Indian spiritual writers
Gandhians
Women Indian independence activists
Indian people of British descent
20th-century Indian women writers
20th-century Indian writers
20th-century British writers